Frank Delgado (born October 19, 1960 in Consolación del Sur, Pinar del Río) is a Cuban musician, and a member of the novísima trova, heir to the nueva trova movement.

Biography 

He was born October 19, 1960 in Consolación del Sur part in the university cultural movements, and won some awards in different festivals. He is a hydraulic engineer by the Instituto Superior Politécnico José Antonio Echeverría.

His first songs (Orden del Día and Río Quibú), were performed and brought to fame by other groups, but later on he sang his own songs. He has sung in more than 120 cities, in over a dozen countries, and his music has been used as soundtrack for radio, television and cinema.

His songs are remarkable because of their lyrics, and speak about love, social affairs and deeply ironic criticism of current Cuban politics and society.

Discography

Albums

 Trova - Tur (1995)
 La Habana Está de Bala (1998)
 El Adivino (2001)
 Mi Mapa (2004)
 ... pero, qué dice el coro? (2006)
 Extremistas Nobles (2010) (together with Cuban pop/rock band Buena Fe (duo))
 Ustedes los trovadores no saben na' de la vida (2012)
 'Más' (2016)

Others
Sonríete Sin Malicia (1993)
 En México (1994)
 Un Buen Lugar (1996)
 Trucho (1999)
 Concierto Inmigrante a Media Jornada (1999)
 A guitarra limpia (2000)
 Otras canciones (2002)
 En cuerdas para cuerdos (2004)

See also 

 Silvio Rodríguez
 Pablo Milanés

External links 
 Frank Delgado's Official Page
 Frank Delgado Youtube Channel
 Listen songs of Frank Delgado
 Songs in CANCIONEROS.COM

1960 births
Living people
People from Consolación del Sur
Cuban songwriters
Male songwriters